Solariella bathyantarctica is a species of sea snail, a marine gastropod mollusk in the family Solariellidae.

Description

Distribution
This species occurs in Antarctic waters.

References

 Numanami H. (1996) Taxonomic study on Antarctic gastropods collected by Japanese Antarctic Research Expeditions. Memoirs of National Institute of Polar Research, Series E, 39: 1–245.

External links

bathyantarctica
Gastropods described in 1996